Inishbarra (Gaeilge: Inis Bearachain) is an island in County Galway situated east of the mouth of Kilkieran bay. An artificial causeway links the island to the mainland but this is only usable at very low tide.

Demographics

References

Islands of County Galway